This is a list of monuments and memorials to Christopher Columbus.

Holidays 

 Argentina 
 The holiday was changed from El día de la Raza (The Day of the Race) (1916) to "Day of Respect of Cultural Diversity" in 2010.
 Colombia 
 El día de la Raza y de la Hispanidad
 Costa Rica
 The holiday was changed from Día de la Raza to Día del Encuentro de las Culturas (Day of the Encounter of Cultures).
Spain
Fiesta Nacional de España (National Day of Spain)
 United States
 Columbus Day

Monuments

Argentina 
 Ayacucho
 Cristóbal Colón (Christopher Columbus) (1895)
 Bernal
 Estatua de Cristóbal Colón (Statue of Christopher Columbus) (1889)
 Buenos Aires
 Hommaje de Billiken a Colón (Monolith for Columbus)
 Cristóbal Colón 'en las Americas' (Christopher Columbus 'in the Americas') (1992)
 Busto de Cristóbal Colón (Bust of Columbus) (1884)
 Monument to Christopher Columbus (Buenos Aires) (1921)
 Monumento a Colón en Liniers (Columbus Monument in Liniers) (1921)
 Chivilcoy
 Cristóbal Colón (Christopher Columbus) (1892)
 Colón
 Cristóbal Colón (Christopher Columbus) (1953)
 Córdoba
 Medallón con retrato en relieve de Colón (Relief portrait medaillon of Columbus)(1930)
 Gaiman
 Monumento a Cristóbal Colón (Columbus Monument) (1892)
 General Roca
 Cristóbal Colón (Christopher Columbus) (1929)
 La Plata
 Monumento a Cristóbal Colón (Columbus Monument)
 Laboulaye
 Monumento de españoles e italianos (Monument of Spanish and Italians) (1965)
 Mar del Plata
 Estatua de Cristóbal Colón (Statue of Christopher Columbus)
 Mendoza
 Monumento a la Hermandad Hispano-Argentina (1947)
 Monte Caseros
 Cristóbal Colón (Christopher Columbus) (1892)
 Salta
 Cristóbal Colón (Christopher Columbus) (1986)
 San Carlos de Bariloche
 Cristobal Colón llega a América (Columbus reaches America) (1947)
 Santa Fe
 Monumento a Cristóbal Colón (Columbus Monument) (1940s)
 Santa Teresita
 Cristóbal Colón (Christopher Columbus) (1992)
 Villaguay
 Busto de Cristóbal Colón (Bust of Columbus)

Bahamas 
 Long Island
 Columbus Monument (1989) 
 New Providence
 Christopher Columbus Statue (1830)
 San Salvador
 Chicago Herald Monument (1891) 
 Columbus Monument (1956) 
 Mexico Olympic Monument (1968), one of three key locations along the 1968 Olympic torch route.   
 Nao Santa Maria Foundation Monument (1991) 
 Olympic Monument at Columbus Landing (1992) 
 Tappan Monument/Heloise Marker (1951)
 Underwater Monument  
 UNESCO Monument/Monument of the Quincentennial (1991)

Belgium 
 Brussels
 The Barcelona Monument to Columbus is reproduced in miniature scale in the miniature park Mini-Europe.

Bolivia 
 La Paz
 Cristóbal Colón (Christopher Columbus) (1920)

Brazil 
 Muçum
 Cristóvão Colombo (Christopher Columbus) (1925)
 Rio de Janeiro
 Cristóvão Colombo (Christopher Columbus)
 Santa Rosa
 Cristóvão Colombo (Christopher Columbus) (1925)
 Santos
 Homenagem ao Descobrimento da América (Monument for the Discovery of America) (1992)
 São Paulo
 Cristóvão Colombo (Christopher Columbus)

Canada 
 Fredericton
 Columbus Quincentennial Flagpole (1992)
 Montréal
 Buste de Christophe Colombe (Bust of Columbus) (1976)
 Oromocto
 Columbus Quincentennial Flagpole (1992)
 Regina
 Model Santa Maria (1992)
 Toronto
 Christopher Columbus Statue (1985)
 Vancouver
 Colombo giovinetto (The First Inspiration of the Boy Columbus) (1870)

Chile 
 Arica
 Busto de Cristóbal Colón (Bust of Columbus) (1910)
 Iquique
 Busto de Cristóbal Colón (Bust of Columbus) (1982)
 Santiago de Chile
 Busto de Cristóbal Colón (Bust of Columbus) (1892 or earlier)
 500th anniversary (1992)
 Valparaiso
 Cristóbal Colón en la Avenida Brasil (Statue of Columbus on the Avenida Brasil) (1877)
 Cristóbal Colón (Christopher Columbus) (1986)

Colombia 
 Barranquilla
 Estatua de Cristóbal Colón (Statue of Columbus) (1910)
 Busto de Cristóbal Colón (Bust of Columbus) (1979)
 Bogotá
 Monumento a la Reina Isabel y Cristobal Colón (Monument for Queen Isabella and Columbus) (1906)
 Cartagena
 Christopher Columbus Monument (1895)

Costa Rica 
 Puerto Limón
 Cristóbal y Hernando Colón (Christopher and Hernando Columbus) (1992)
 San José
 Cristóbal Colón (Christopher Columbus) (1960)

Cuba 
 Baracoa
 Cruz de Parra
 Cristóbal Colón (Christopher Columbus)
 Bayamo
 Cristóbal Colón (Christopher Columbus) (1892)
 Cárdenas
 Cristóbal Colón (Christopher Columbus) (1862)
 Cayo Bariay
	Encounter of cultures (1992)
 Colón
 Cristóbal Colón (Christopher Columbus) (1892)
 Guardalavaca (Banes)
 Cristóbal Colón (Christopher Columbus)
 La Habana
 Tumba de Colón (Columbus' Tomb)
 Busto de Colón en la puerta del Cementerio de Colón (Bust of Columbus on the gate of Columbus' Cemetery) (1880)
 Estatua de Colón en el Museo de la Ciudad (Statue of Columbus on the City Museum) (1862)
 Busto de Colón en el Museo de la Revolución (Bust of Columbus in the Museum of the Revolution) (1928)
 Busto de Colón en el Templete (Bust of Columbus in the Templete) (1828)
 Matanzas
 Cristóbal Colón (Christopher Columbus)
 Santiago de Cuba
 Cristóbal Colón (Christopher Columbus)

Dominican Republic 
 Santo Domingo
 Columbus Lighthouse (Faro a Colón, 1992). Museum, not a lighthouse, containing Columbus’ alleged remains.
 Parque Colon (before 1887)

Ecuador 
 Quito
 Cristóbal Colón (Christopher Columbus)

Egypt 
 Alexandria
 Christopher Columbus Statue

El Salvador 
 San Salvador
 Cristóbal Colón y la reina Isabel (Statues of Columbus and Queen Isabella) (1924)

Guatemala 
 Guatemala City
 Monumento a Colón (Columbus Monument) (1896)
 Cristóbal Colón (Christopher Columbus)
 Salcajá
 Cruz de Colón (Columbus cross)

Haiti 
 Port-au-Prince
 Christophe Colomb (Christopher Columbus). Statue removed in 1987.

Honduras 
 Comayagüela
 Cristóbal Colón (Christopher Columbus) (1892)
 Trujillo
 Cristóbal Colón (Christopher Columbus)

Ireland 

 Galway
 Monument to Christopher Columbus (1992)

Italy 
 Abano Terme
 Cristoforo Colombo (Christopher Columbus) (1956)
 Bettola
 Lapide commemorativa del 400° anniversario (Plaque 400th anniversary) (1892)
 Cristoforo Colombo (Statue of Christopher Columbus) (1892)
 Lapidi sulla Torre Colombo (Plaques on the Torre Colombo) (1957)
 Bistagno
 Colombo giovinetto (The First Inspiration of the Boy Columbus) (1870)
 Chiavari
 Cristoforo Colombo (Statue of Christopher Columbus) (1935)
 Chiusanico
 Caravella nel marciapiede (Caravel Pavement) (1992)
 Casa Colombo (Columbus' House)
 Lapide del'origine della famiglia di Colombo (Plaque Origin Columbus' Family) (1967)
 Busto di Cristoforo Colombo (Bust of Columbus)
 Cicagna
 Cristoforo Colombo (Statue of Christopher Columbus) (1892)
 Cogoleto
 Lapide sulla chiesa Sta. Maria (Plaque on the church) (1888)
 Lapide commemorativa della visita de Princetown nel 1847 (Plaque visit Princetown in 1847) (1888)
 Monumento a Cristoforo Colombo (Columbus monument) (1864)
 Ritratto e le scene della vita di Colombo (Columbus portrait and life scenes) (1992)
 Affresco sulla casa natale di Colombo (Fresco on Columbus' birth house) (1650)
 Lapide commemorativa della visita di re Umberto I nel 1857 (Plaque visit King Umberto in 1857) (1888)
 Cogoleto Municipio (Portrait and ship model at Cogoleto town hall)
 Cuccaro Monferrato
 Monumento del 500° anniversario (500th anniversary monument) (1992)
 Lapide commemorativa del 500° anniversario (Plaque 500th anniversary) (1992)
 Lapide commemorativa del dinastia di Colombo (Plaque for the Colombo dynasty) (1992)
 Diano Marina
 Cristoforo Colombo (Statue of Christopher Columbus) (1892)
 Fontanarossa (Piacenza)
 Lapide sulla casa natale di madre di Colombo (Plaque birthplace Columbus' mother, Susanna Fontanarossa) (1958)
 Genova
 La Vela di Columbo (The Sail of Columbus) (1998)
 Marciapiede Campopisano (Campopisano Pavement) (1992)
 Rilievi del Castello D'Albertis (Reliefs in the Castello D'Albertis) (1892)
 Colombo giovinetto (The First Inspiration of the Boy Columbus) (1870)
 Il Bigo (The Mast) (1992)
 Lapide sulla Palazzo di San Giorgio (Plaque on the San Giorgio Palace) (1951)
 Affresco sulla facciata del Palazzo di San Giorgio (Fresco on the façade of the San Giorgio Palace)
 Busto di Cristoforo Colombo nel Palazzo Reale (Bust of Columbus) (1864)
 Monumento a Colombo nel Palazzo Rosso (Columbus Monument in the Palazzo Rosso) (1851)
 Monumento a Colombo in Piazza Acquaverde (Columbus Monument on Piazza Acquaverde) (1846)
 Rilievi su Piazza Dante (Reliefs on Piazza Dante)
 Busto di Cristoforo Colombo nel Palazzo della Regione (Bust of Columbus in the Regione Liguria Palace) (1934)
 Giardini di Colombo (Columbus gardens)
 Ritratto di Colombo con le navi (Columbus Portrait with ships) (1984)
 Busto di Cristoforo Colombo nel Stazione Marittima (Bust of Columbus in the Stazione Marittima)
 La Nave Umana (Human Ship) (1992)
 Statua di Cristoforo Colombo nel Liceo Colombo (Statue of Columbus in the Columbus school) (1892)
 Busto di Cristoforo Colombo nel Palazzo Tursi (Bust of Columbus in the Palazzo Tursi) (1821)
 Statua di Cristoforo Colombo in Via Gramsci (Statue of Columbus in the Via Gramsci) (1850)
 Casa de Colombo (Columbus' House)
 La Spezia
 Due statue di Cristoforo Colombo (Two Statues of Columbus)
 Lavagna
 Cristoforo Colombo (Statue of Christopher Columbus) (1930)
 Lucca
 San Michele e 35 protomi di figure storiche (Saint Michael and 35 protomes of historical figures)
 Milano
 Statua di Cristoforo Colombo (Statue of Christopher Columbus) (19th century)
 Busto di Cristoforo Colombo (Bust of Christopher Columbus) (1900)
 Mirandola
 Medaglioni ritratto di illustri italiani (Portrait medaillons of famous Italians)
 Moconesi
 Affresco con Colombo, Dante e Petrarca (Fresco showing Columbus, Dante and Petrarca)
 La Casa degli Avi di Colombo(Columbus Ancestral house)	
 Scultura commemorativa di Colombo (Sculpture commemorating Columbus) (1979)
 Lapide commemorativa de 1889 (Memorial plaque of 1889) (1889)
 Lapide commemorativa del 500° anniversario (Plaque 500th Anniversary) (1992)
 Noli
 Commemorazione della partenza di Colombo da Genova nel 1476 (Commemoration Columbus departure from Genoa in 1476) (1948)
 Ovada
 Ritratto di Cristoforo Colombo (Portrait of Columbus) (1992)
 Parma
 Colombo giovinetto (The First Inspiration of the Boy Columbus) (1870)
 Pavia
 Busto di Cristoforo Colombo (Bust of Columbus) (1882)
 Rapallo
 Affresco di Colombo e altri illustri italiani (Fresco of Columbus and other famous Italians)
 Cristoforo Colombo (Christopher Columbus) (1914)
 Roma
 Busto di Cristoforo Colombo (Bust of Columbus) (1817)
 San Colombano Certenoli
 Cristoforo Colombo (Christopher Columbus) (1992)
 Santa Margherita Ligure
 Cristoforo Colombo (Christopher Columbus) (1892)
 Santo Stefano d'Aveto
 Ritratto di Colombo (Portrait of Columbus)
 Savona
	Busto di Cristoforo Colombo (Bust of Christopher Columbus) (1928)
 Commemorativa sulla casa del padre di Colombo (Memorial on the house of Columbus' father) (1940)
 Commemorativa in Via San Giuliano (Columbus memorial in the Via San Giuliano) (1892)
 Sestri Levante
	Vela per Cristoforo Colombo (Christopher Columbus's Sail) (2002)
 Torino
 Ritratto di Colombo (Portrait of Columbus) (1923)

Jamaica 
 Discovery Bay
 Cross at Columbus' Landing
 St. Ann's Bay
 New Seville Plaque
 Christopher Columbus Statue

Japan 
 Shima, Mie
 A reproduction of the Barcelona monument is found in the Shima Spanish Village.
 Urayasu, Chiba
A statue of Christopher Columbus is located at the American Waterfront section of Tokyo DisneySea.

Mexico 
 Mexico City
 Monument to Christopher Columbus (Buenavista, Mexico City), Buenavista (1892)
 Monument to Christopher Columbus (Paseo de la Reforma, Mexico City), Paseo de la Reforma (1877)

Nicaragua 
 Managua
 Cristóbal Colón (Christopher Columbus)

Panama 
 Colón
 Monumento a Cristóbal Colón (1867)

Paraguay 
 Asunción
 Busto de Cristóbal Colón (Bust of Columbus)

Peru 
 Callao
 Cristóbal Colón (Christopher Columbus)
 Cuzco
 Placa conmemorativa de la resistencia andina (Plaque for Andean resistance) (1992)
 Lima
 Monumento a Cristóbal Colón (Columbus Monument) (1867)
 Pisco
 Cristóbal Colón (Christopher Columbus)
 Tacna
 Cristóbal Colón (Christopher Columbus) (1892)

Portugal 
 Cuba
 Cristóvão Colombo (Christopher Columbus) (2006)
 Cristóvão Colombo (Christopher Columbus) (2010)
 Funchal
 Regata "América 500" (1992)
 Cristóvão Colombo (Christopher Columbus) (1940)

 Lisboa
 Mural mostrando os Descobrimentos Português (Mural showing Portuguese Discoveries) (1994)
 Vila Baleira (Ilha do Porto Santo)
 Cristóvão Colombo (Christopher Columbus) (1989)
 Vila do Porto
 Cristóvão Colombo (Christopher Columbus) (1992)

Puerto Rico 
 Arecibo, Puerto Rico
 Birth of the New World (2016)

Spain 

 Alcalá de Henares
 Monumento al Descubrimiento de América (Monument for the Discovery of America) (1986)
Barcelona
Columbus Monument, Barcelona (1888). Called in Spanish “Mirador de Colón”, because it can be ascended internally to viewing windows. At the foot there are “various combinations of sculptures related to the discovery of America”.
Cádiz
Placa conmemorativa del segundo viaje de Colón (Commemoration Plaque for Columbus 2nd voyage) (1993)
Cartagena
Monumento a Colón, Muralla del Mar (1882)
Córdoba 
Cristobal Colón y los Reyes Católicos (Columbus with King Ferdinand and Queen Isabella)
Granada
Monumento a Isabel la Católica y Cristóbal Colón, Gran Vía de Colón (1892)
Huelva
Monument to the Discovery Faith, sculpted by Gertrude Vanderbilt Whitney and donated to Spain through the Columbus Memorial Foundation in 1929.
:es:Monumento a Colón (Huelva) (2011)
Jerez de los Caballeros
Monumento a Colón (1929)
Las Palmas de Gran Canaria
Monumento a Colón, Alameda de Colón (1892)
Casa de Colón (1992)
L'Arboç, Tarragona
 There is a reproduction of the Barcelona monument (statue only) in mahogany wood, on top of building Les Amériques.
Madrid
Monument to Columbus, 1881–1885
Monumento al Descubrimiento de América, Jardines del Descubrimiento (1977) (Monument for the Discovery of America, Discovery Gardens) 
Maspalomas, Gran Canaria
 Reproduction of Barcelona monument (2006)
Moguer
Monumento a Colón (2006)
Palos de la Frontera
Monumento al Descubrimiento de América (1892-1893)
Estatua de Colón (2006)
Playa de las Americas, Tenerife
Monumento a Colón
Pontevedra
Monumento a Colón, Jardines de Colón (1892)
 Salamanca
Medallón de Colón (Columbus Medallion), Plaza Mayor (1733)
Monumento a Colón en Valcuevo (Valcuevo's Columbus Monument) (1866)
 Monumento a Colón, Plaza de Colón (1893)
 San Antonio, Ibiza
 Monumento al Descubrimiento de América (1992)
 San Fernando
 Estatua de Colón (1895)
 San Sebastián de la Gomera
 Busto de Colón (Bust of Columbus) (2006)
 Santa Fe
 Monumento a Cristóbal Colón (1981)
 Sevilla
Tumba de Cristóbal Colón (Columbus' tomb) (1899)
Monumento a Cristóbal Colón (Columbus Monument) (1921)
Estatua de Cristóbal Colón en La Cartuja (Christopher Columbus in La Cartuja) (1887)
Birth of a New Man (1995)
 Valencia
 Busto de Colón (1892)
Valladolid 
Monument to Columbus, Plaza de Colón (1905)
Casa Museo de Colón. Columbus house and place of death in 1506.

United Kingdom 

 London
 Statue of Christopher Columbus, Belgrave Square (1992)
 Statue of Christopher Columbus, Sefton Palm House, Liverpool

United States

Alabama 
 Birmingham
 Christopher Columbus Statue. Located at 10th Avenue South 1600.(Smolian International House).

Arizona 
 Phoenix
 Christopher Columbus Statue. Located at N. 12th St. 7509 (Arizona American Italian Club).

California 
 Santa Barbara
 Columbus Relief (1952) Located at Junipero Serra Hall.
 Los Angeles 
 Christopher Columbus Statue (1973) Located at Civic Center Mall.  
 Christopher Columbus Relief (1927-1932) Located at Hollywood Blvd. / N. Highland Ave (Hollywood First National Building).
 Chula Vista 
 Statue of Christopher Columbus (1990) Located at Discovery Park.
 Santa Ana 
 Christopher Columbus Monument Located at Bowers Museum.
 Roseville 
  Christopher Columbus Statue (1976) Located at Vernon St. at City Hall.

Colorado 
 Denver 
 Statue of Christopher Columbus (1970) located at Civic Center Park (Promenade) destroyed by protestors in 2020.
 Durango 
 Bust of Christopher Columbus  located at Greenmount Cemetery
 Pueblo 
 Bust of Christopher Columbus (1905) located at East Abriendo Avenue

Connecticut 

 Bridgeport 
 Statue of Christopher Columbus (1965) located at Seaside Park
 Hartford
 Christopher Columbus Statue (1926) located at Columbus Green - Washington Street
 Meriden 
 Columbus Monument (1992) located at City Hall
 Middletown 
 Statue of Christopher Columbus, located at Columbus Point at Harbor Park
 Milford 
 Bust of Christopher Columbus (1992) located at West River Street 70 (Columbus Plaza)
 New Britain
 Christopher Columbus Statue (1941) located at Columbus Park (Main & North streets)
 New Haven 
 Christopher Columbus Statue (1892, 1955) located at Wooster Square.  Removed June 24, 2020.
 New London 
 Statue of Christopher Columbus (1928) located at Bank Street
 Norwalk 
 Christopher Columbus Statue (1940) located at Thomas O'Connor Park
 Norwich
 Columbus Monument (1992) located at Broadway / Crescent Street
 Stamford 
 Christopher Columbus Statue (1960) located at Columbus Park
 Stamford
 Columbus Marker (1992) located at Columbus Park
 Waterbury 
 Christopher Columbus Statue (1984) located at City Hall Plaza (Grand Street)
 Willimantic 
 Christopher Columbus Statue (1892) located at St. Joseph Church

Delaware 
 Wilmington 
 Statue of Christopher Columbus, located at Columbus Square - Pennsylvania Avenue

District of Columbia 
 Union Station
 Columbus Fountain at Columbus Circle (1912)
 Washington D.C. 
 Christopher Columbus Statue (1992) located at 3rd & F Sts., NW (Holy Rosary Church)
 Christopher Columbus Statue (1897) located at Library of Congress, Jefferson Building (Main Reading Room)

Florida 
 Fort Lauderdale 
 Christopher Columbus Statue (1987) located at Port Everglades, Marinelli Gardens (Eller Drive)
 Miami 
 Statue of Christopher Columbus (1952, 1992) located at Bayfront Park
 Pensacola 
 Bust of Christopher Columbus (1992) located at City Hall in downtown Pensacola.
 Port Charlotte 
 Bust of Christopher Columbus (1993) located at 2500 Easy Street, St. Charles Borromeo Catholic Church
 Sarasota 
 Bust of Christopher Columbus located at Bay Shore Road 5401 (The John and Mable Ringling Museum of Art)
 Sarasota 
 Christopher Columbus Statue (1925) located at St. Armands Circle, St. Armand's key
 St. Petersburg 
 Christopher Columbus Statue (1960) located at Bayshore Dr. / 2nd Ave NE
 Tampa
 Columbus Statue Park (1953). Located at Bayshore Boulevard at Platt Street Bridge

Georgia 
 Columbus
 Christopher Columbus Statue (1992) located on the Chattahoochee Riverwalk. Four-part memorial you can access at the entrance stairs leading from 10th street

Illinois 
 Chicago 
 Christopher Columbus Statue (1892) located at South Chicago and Exchange Avenues, South Chicago, Chicago Temporarily removed by orders of Mayor Lori Lightfoot on July 31, 2020. At the time, it was the last known Columbus monument which wasn't removed.
Christopher Columbus Statue (1893) located in Arrigo Park. Removed on July 24, 2020.
Statue of Christopher Columbus (1933) located in Grant Park. Removed on July 24, 2020.
 Kankakee
 Christopher Columbus Memorial (1907) located at South Eighth Avenue / Water Street (Kankakee County Historical Society)
 Peoria 
 Christopher Columbus Statue (1902) located at Laura Bradley Park
 University Park
 Columbus Bell Tower (1992) located at Governors State University

Iowa 
 Des Moines
 Bust of Christopher Columbus (1938) located at Capitol Grounds

Indiana 
 Indianapolis 
 Bust of Christopher Columbus (1920) located at South West grounds of State Capitol Building
 Mishawaka
 Christopher Columbus Statue located at E Mishawaka Avenue / Christyann Street (Central Park)
 Notre Dame
 Murals depicting Columbus inside the Main Building of the University of Notre Dame, painted by Vatican artist Luigi Gregori between 1882 and 1884. These murals have been covered by removable tapestries since 2020, amid ongoing controversy over their depiction of Indigenous people.

Louisiana 
 Baton Rouge 
 State of Christopher Columbus (1992) located at Government St. / River Rd. (Maritime Plaza)
 Columbia 
 Statues of Columbus and Washington (1916) located at Main Street 107
 New Orleans 
 Plaza de España Mural (1976, 2001) located near Canal St and Convention Center Blvd
 Shreveport 
 Christopher Columbus Statue (1897) located at Creswell Avenue 4747 (R. W. Norton Art Gallery)

Massachusetts 
 Boston
 Statue of Christopher Columbus (Beacon Hill, Boston)
 Chelsea
 Statue of Christopher Columbus (1938) located at Dorothy M. Griffin Square
 Haverhill
 Columbus Monument (1992) located at Columbus Park
 Middleton
 Columbus Window  located at St. Agnes Rectory
 Revere
 Christopher Columbus Statue (1892) located at St Anthony of Padua Church
 Waltham
 Columbus Monument (1992) located at Waltham Common
 Watertown
 Columbus Delta Monument (1940) located at Main Street
 Worcester 
 Marble Christopher Columbus Statue (1978) located at Washington Square/Union Station

Maryland 
 Baltimore
 Christopher Columbus Statue (1892) located at Druid Hill Park
 Dundalk 
 Christopher Columbus Statue (2004) located at Eilers Avenue 2111 (Knights of Columbus)
 Ocean City
 Christopher Columbus Monument (1985) located at Northside Park

Michigan 
 Dearborn 
 Bust of Christopher Columbus (1975) located at Oakman Boulevard
 Detroit 
 Bust of Christopher Columbus (1910) located at Randolph Street
 Saginaw 
 Columbus Monument (1991) located in front of Saginaw County's government offices

Missouri 
 Kansas City
 Lamppost commemorating Columbus (1992) located at Country Club Plaza 
 St. Louis 
 Bust of Christopher Columbus (1855) located at University Boulevard 1 (Mercantile Library, Thomas Jefferson Library Building)

Montana 
 Great Falls 
 Christopher Columbus Statue (1908) located at Mount Olivet Cemetery

Nebraska 
 Columbus 
 The Quincentenary Belltower (1992) located at Pawnee Park

New Jersey 
 Atlantic City 
 Christopher Columbus Statue located at Arkansas & Atlantic Avenue (Columbus Plaza)
 Bayonne 
 Bust of Christopher Columbus  located at Mary Griffith Peters Sculpture Garden (Public Library & Cultural Center - 697 Avenue C)
 Camden 
 Statue of Christopher Columbus (1915) located at Farnham Park
 East Hanover 
 Bust of Christopher Columbus (1996) 
 Elizabeth 
 Christopher Columbus Statue (1971) located at Third Avenue
 Ewing 
 Quincentennial tree with plaque (1992) located at Jake Garzio Drive 2
 Garfield 
 Christopher Columbus "The New World" Monument (1992, 1998) located at Dahnert Lake County Park 
 Columbus Memorial (1967) located at Columbus Park
 Hackensack 
 Bust of Christopher Columbus (1976) located at Columbus Park
 Hammonton 
 Bust of Christopher Columbus (1992) located at Egg Harbor Road, 1 block east of Route 54
 Hoboken 
 Christopher Columbus Statue (1937) located at Columbus Park
 Jersey City 
 La Vela di Colombo - The Sail of Columbus monument (1998) located at Liberty State Park 
 Christopher Columbus Statue (1950) located at Journal Square
 Kearny 
 Bust of Christopher Columbus (1967) located at Kearny Riverbank Park
 Lodi 
 Christopher Columbus Statue (1965) located at Memorial Drive 1 (Memorial Library)
 Christopher Columbus Statue (1982) located at Christopher Columbus Park
 Long Branch 
 Christopher Columbus Statue (1961) located at Slocum Park - Broadway
 Lyndhurst
 Columbus Monument (1970) located at Delafield Avenue
 Montville
 Bust of Christopher Columbus (1999) located at Municipal Building
 Newark
 Christopher Columbus Statue in Washington Park (1927) located at Washington Park 
 Christopher Columbus Statue in Xavier Park (1972) located at Bloomfield Avenue (Xavier Park)
 North Arlington
 Christopher Columbus Statue (1992) located at River Road (Columbus Park)
 Nutley
 Columbus Day Monument (1992) located at Chestnut Street / Kennedy Drive 
 Bust of Christopher Columbus (2000) located at Chestnut Street / Kennedy Drive
 Ocean Township
 Relief with Columbus' fleet (1992) located near Monmouth Rd and Deal Rd
 Parsippany 
 Christopher Columbus Statue (1992) located at Parsippany Blvd.
 Passaic
 Christopher Columbus Monument (1992) located at Passaic Avenue
 Paterson
 Bust of Christopher Columbus (1953) located at Federici Park, Cianci Street & Curtis Place
 Pennsauken
 Christopher Columbus Statue (1988) located at Cooper River Park
 Phillipsburg
 Christopher Columbus Statue (1892) located at South Main & Stockton Streets (St. Philip & St James School)
 Ridgefield
 Bust of Christopher Columbus (1975) located at Englehart Terrace (Edgewater Avenue & Shaler Boulevard)
 Scotch Plains
 Christopher Columbus Monument (1998) located at 430 Park Ave. (Municipal Building)
 Secaucus
 Bust of Christopher Columbus  located at Paterson Plank Road & Humboldt Street
 Trenton 
 Christopher Columbus Statue (1959) located at Columbus Park (Hamilton Avenue)
 Union City 
 Bust of Christopher Columbus (1979) located at Ellsworth Park (24th St. & New York Ave.)
 West New York 
 Christopher Columbus Relief (1958) located at Christopher Columbus Park
 West Orange 
 Columbus Monument (1992) located at Valley Road
 Williamstown 
 Christopher Columbus Statue (1992) located at Main Street / Blue Bell Road

New York 
 Harrison
 Christopher Columbus Statue (1949, 1992) located at Broadway
 Huntington 
 Christopher Columbus Statue (1970, 1986, 1995) located at Columbus Plaza (W. Main Street and Lawrence Hill Rd.)
 Lackawanna
 Bust of Christopher Columbus (1940) located at Bethlehem Park, Madison Ave.
 Lindenhurst 
 Columbus Monument (1991) 7-foot-tall monument
 Mahopac 
 Christopher Columbus Statue (1992) located at Thompson & McAlpin Streets (Town Hall)
 Mamaroneck 
 Columbus Relief (1936) located at Columbus Park
 Mineola 
 Christopher Columbus Statue located at the Courthouse in Mineola, NY
 Mount Kisco 
 Christopher Columbus Statue (1992) located at Village Center Park (Main St.)
 New Rochelle 
 Christopher Columbus Statue (2001) located at Hudson Park
 New York City, Manhattan
 Columbus Monument, Columbus Circle (1892)
 Statue of Christopher Columbus (Central Park)
 Christopher Columbus as symbol for Genua (1907) located at Bowling Green, Manhattan (The U.S. Customs House)
 Christopher Columbus in Queens (1941) located at Astoria Blvd, Queens
 Columbus Bust in Bronx (1925) located at D'Auria-Murphy Triange, Bronx
 Columbus decoration in station (1904) located at 59th Street-Columbus Circle (IRT West Side)
 Hello Columbus! mural (1992) located at 8th Avenue (59th Street-Columbus Circle)
 Christopher Columbus Statue (1867) located at Columbus Park, Cadman Plaza East, Brooklyn
 Newburgh
 Christopher Columbus Statue (1992) located at Waterfront (Unico Park)
 Niagara Falls 
 Wall Mural (2000) located at Cristoforo Colombo Society
 Port Chester 
 Christopher Columbus Statue (1950) located at Columbus Park
 Poughkeepsie 
 Christopher Columbus Statue (1992) located at Columbus Drive / Mill Street
 Rochester 
 Bust of Christopher Columbus (1967) located at Exchange Blvd 99 (Rochester Civic Center, Hall of Justice)
 Schenectady 
 Christopher Columbus Quincentennial (1992) located at State Street
 Syracuse 
 Christopher Columbus Statue (1932) located at Columbus Circle
 Tarrytown 
 Christopher Columbus Statue (1963) located at Patriots' Park, North Broadway
 Utica 
 Christopher Columbus Statue (1952) located at Parkway, Parkway East and Mohawk Street
 White Plains
 Christopher Columbus Statue (1915) located at N. Broadway
 Yonkers, New York
 Bust of Christopher Columbus (1913) located at Park Hill Ave. (Columbus Park)
 Statue decapitated in 2017.

Ohio 
 Akron
 Christopher Columbus Statue (1938) located at Triplett Boulevard (Akron Municipal Airport)
 Cleveland
 Christopher Columbus Statue (1988) located at Mayfield Road 12015 (Holy Rosary Catholic School)
 Columbus, Ohio
 Statue of Christopher Columbus (Ohio Statehouse) (c.1890–1892)
 Lorain City
 Columbus Monument located at Meister Rd.
 Mayfield Heights
 Christopher Columbus Statue (1988) located at Mayfield Road 5947 (Knights of Columbus)

Pennsylvania 
 Bethlehem
 Memorial to Admiral Christopher Columbus (1992). Removed in 2021. 
 Bristol
 Bust of Christopher Columbus (1992)
 Bryn Mawr
 Bust of Christopher Columbus (1952)
 Carbondale
 Bust of Christopher Columbus (1959)
 Chester
 Christopher Columbus Statue (1955)
 Conshohocken
 Bust of Christopher Columbus (1970)
 Easton
 Christopher Columbus Statue (1930)
 Hazleton
 Christopher Columbus Statue (1952)
 Lancaster
 Bust of Christopher Columbus (1992)
 Norristown
 Hello Columbus Monument (1992)
 Philadelphia
 Christopher Columbus Marble Sculpture
 Christopher Columbus Monument (1876)
 Columbus Obelisk (1992)
 Bust of Christopher Columbus (1920)
 Pittsburgh
 Christopher Columbus Statue (1958)
 Pittston
 Christopher Columbus Statue (1969)
 Scranton
 Christopher Columbus Monument (1892)

Virginia 
Richmond
Statue of Christopher Columbus (Richmond, Virginia) (1927)

Washington State 
Walla Walla
Statue of Christopher Columbus (1911)

Puerto Rico 
 Arecibo
San Juan
Monumento a Colón, Plaza de Colón (1893)

Uruguay 
 Durazno
 Monumento a Colón (Columbus Monument) (1892)
 Montevideo
 Cristóbal Colón (Christopher Columbus) (1927)

Venezuela 
 Caracas
 Cristóbal Colón en el Parque El Calvario (Christopher Columbus in the El Calvario Park) (1893)
 Carúpano
 Cristóbal Colón (Christopher Columbus) (1892)
 Macuro
 Cristóbal Colón (Christopher Columbus) (1974)
 Mérida
 Busto de Cristóbal Colón (Bust of Columbus) (1895)
 Mucuchachí
 Busto de Cristóbal Colón (Bust of Columbus) (1930?)

Places

Canada 
 British Columbia, province (1792)

South America 
 Colombia and the earlier Greater Colombia, country of South America.
 Colón, Panama, city
 Colón (Panamanian province)
 Colombo (Brazilian municipality in the state of Parana, Brazil)

Southeast Asia 
 Colombo, former capital of Sri Lanka (altered by the Portuguese from similar-sounding native name)
 Colon Street, Cebu, Philippines

United States 
At least 54 U.S. communities are named for Christopher Columbus.

 Columbia, Maryland, city
 Columbia, Missouri, city
 Columbia, South Carolina, city (1786)
 Columbus, Georgia, city
 Columbus, Indiana, city
 Columbus, Mississippi, city
 Columbus, Nebraska, city
 Columbus, Texas,  city
 Columbus, Wisconsin, city
 Columbus, Montana
 Columbus, Ohio (1812)
 District of Columbia (1791)
 Columbiana County, Ohio
 Columbiana, Ohio, city
 Columbia County, New York
 Columbia County, Pennsylvania
 Columbia County, Wisconsin
 Columbus Circle, New York City

Schools

United States 
 Columbia University (1784)

See also
 Monument and memorial controversies in the United States#Christopher Columbus (2017)
 Monument and memorial controversies in the United States#Murals of Columbus (2019)
 List of monuments and memorials removed during the George Floyd protests#Christopher Columbus

References

Further reading (most recent first)
 
 
 
 

List
Columbus, Christopher